"Bark at the Moon" is a song by heavy metal vocalist Ozzy Osbourne. It was the first single released from his 1983 album of the same name. The music video produced for the song was Osbourne's first.  It peaked at #21 on the UK Singles Chart and #12 on Billboards Album Rock Tracks. The song has received critical praise, frequently being voted one of Ozzy's best songs.

Overview

Writing
Though officially credited solely to Osbourne, "Bark at the Moon" was co-written with guitarist Jake E. Lee and bassist/lyricist Bob Daisley. Daisley has stated that he accepted a buyout from Osbourne in exchange for all writing credits on the album. Lee, however, claims he was threatened with firing by Osbourne's wife and manager Sharon if he refused to sign a 1983 contract stating that he would relinquish his claims to writing and publishing. In the liner notes to The Ozzman Cometh, Osbourne himself, acknowledged that Lee was involved in the song's writing saying, "I had the vocal line for this [song] and Jake came up with the riff. It was the first song we wrote together."

Music video
Lyrically, the song deals with a creature of some sort who once terrorized a town, was killed, and later mysteriously returned to once again wreak havoc upon the villagers. The music video, however, borrows heavily from Robert Louis Stevenson's classic Dr. Jekyll and Mr. Hyde story, depicting Osbourne as a "mad scientist" who ingests a substance in his laboratory which causes him to transform into the werewolf depicted on the Bark at the Moon album cover. Thought to be insane, he is subsequently committed to a mental institution. The make-up effects were done by Rick Baker, best known for his work on John Landis's An American Werewolf in London and the music video for Michael Jackson's Thriller (which Landis also directed).

The music video for the song was partially filmed at the Holloway Sanatorium, outside London, England. In the early 1980s infancy of the music video medium, the video, which was the first Osbourne had made, was highly anticipated due to his outrageous image. Drummer Tommy Aldridge played on the studio recording of the track, but the video features his replacement in the band, Carmine Appice.

Cover versions
American punk rock band Strung Out recorded a version for the 2000 Punk Goes Metal compilation album.
The deluxe edition of the 2009 album Retribution by American thrash metal band Shadows Fall includes a cover of the song, which was released as a single in 2010.
Horror punk band Frankenstein Drag Queens from Planet 13 released a version of the song on their 2001 album Viva Las Violence.
The song appeared on the 2002 video game Grand Theft Auto: Vice City on the radio station "V-Rock".
A cover of the song appeared as the final song in the music video game Guitar Hero, while a master recording was later featured in Guitar Hero Smash Hits.

Personnel
Ozzy Osbourne – vocals
Jake E. Lee – guitar
Bob Daisley – bass
Tommy Aldridge – drums
Don Airey – keyboards

Charts

References 

1983 singles
Ozzy Osbourne songs
Songs written by Bob Daisley
Songs written by Ozzy Osbourne
Songs about werewolves
Songs about the Moon
Songs written by Jake E. Lee
Jet Records singles
1983 songs